Trances is the second album by the American ambient musician Robert Rich. Like his first album Sunyata, this album consists of slow, textural drone music.

In 1994 this album was bound with Rich's third album, Drones, on the two-disc set Trances/Drones. In this release the title track from Sunyata was added to Trances.

Track listing
"Cave Paintings" – 23:54
"Hayagriva" – 25:13

References

1983 albums
Robert Rich (musician) albums